I. M. Singer may refer to:

Isadore Singer (1924–2021), American mathematician
Isaac Singer (1811–1875), inventor of the Singer sewing machine